This list contains a variety of examples of high fantasy or epic fantasy fiction. The list is ordered alphabetically by author or originator's last name. A separate section is included for non-print media.

Works

A
 Joe Abercrombie's The First Law trilogy
 Daniel Abraham's The Long Price Quartet series and The Dagger and the Coin series
 Lloyd Alexander's The Chronicles of Prydain
 Victoria Aveyard's Red Queen Series
 Hans Joachim Alpers's Die Piraten des Südmeers
 Poul Anderson's Three Hearts and Three Lions
 Piers Anthony's Xanth
 Sarah Ash's The Tears of Artamon trilogy
 Robert Asprin's MythAdventures

B
 R. Scott Bakker's Prince of Nothing series
 L. Frank Baum's Oz series and Gregory Maguire's The Wicked Years, a revisionist version of the same setting
 Peter S. Beagle's The Last Unicorn
 Frank Beddor's The Looking Glass Wars
 John Bellairs's The Face in the Frost
 Andrei Belyanin's Sword with No Name
 Hans Bemmann's The Enchanted trilogy
 K. J. Bishop's The Etched City
 Elizabeth H. Boyer's World of the Alfar, Wizard's War, and Skyla series
 Marion Zimmer Bradley's The Mists of Avalon
 Gillian Bradshaw's Arthurian trilogy (Hawk of May, Kingdom of Summer, In Winter's Shadow)
 Patricia Bray's The Sword of Change trilogy (Devlin's Luck, Devlin's Honor, Devlin's Justice
 Marie Brennan's Doppelganger
 Peter V. Brett's Demon Cycle series
 Kristen Britain's Green Rider series 
 Terry Brooks's Shannara series
 N. M. Browne's The Spellgrinder's Apprentice
 Lois McMaster Bujold's Chalion series
 Emma Bull's War for the Oaks
 Aleksandr Bushkov's Svarog series
 Jim Butcher's Codex Alera series

C
 Trudi Canavan's The Black Magician series and Age of the Five trilogy
 Jacqueline Carey's Kushiel's Legacy series 
 Patrick Carman's Land of Elyon series
 Joy Chant's Red Moon and Black Mountain
 C. J. Cherryh's Ealdwood Stories and The Fortress Series
 Kate Constable's Chanters of Tremaris series
 Glen Cook's The Black Company series, Sung in Blood The Dread Empire series

 Susan Cooper's The Dark Is Rising
 Alison Croggon's Pellinor series

D
 Charles de Lint's Moonheart
 Susan Dennard's Truthwitch
 Peter Dickinson's Angel Isle
 Stephen R. Donaldson's The Chronicles of Thomas Covenant series
 Sara Douglass's The Wayfarer Redemption series
 Brian Lee Durfee's The Forgetting Moon
 Lord Dunsany's The King of Elfland's Daughter
 David Anthony Durham's Acacia trilogy
 Maryna and Serhiy Dyachenko's Wanderers tetralogy, The Key of the Kingdom trilogy and Varan/The Copper King duology

E
 David and Leigh Eddings' Belgariad/Malloreon series, Elenium/Tamuli series,The Redemption of Althalus, and The Dreamers series
 E. R. Eddison's The Worm Ouroboros and Zimiamvian Trilogy
 Kate Elliott's Crown of Stars series
 Michael Ende's The Neverending Story
 Steven Erikson's Malazan world (Book of the Fallen and related series)
 Also Ian C. Esslemont's books set in the Malazan world
 Kirill Eskov's The Last Ringbearer

F
 Jennifer Fallon's The Demon Child Trilogy, The Hythrun Chronicles and Second Sons Trilogy
 David Farland's The Runelords series
 Bill Fawcett's SwordQuest series
 Raymond E. Feist's The Riftwar Cycle
 Jude Fisher's Fool's Gold series
 John Flanagan's Ranger's Apprentice series
 Lynn Flewelling's Nightrunner series

G
 Neil Gaiman's Stardust
 Alan Garner's The Owl Service
 David Gemmell's Legend series
 Mary Gentle's Grunts!
 Felix Gilman's Ararat novels
 Parke Godwin
 Julia Golding's Dragonfly
 Lisa Goldstein
 Vasili Golovachov's The Saviors of the Fan series
 Terry Goodkind's Sword of Truth series
 Ed Greenwood "Forgotten Realms"
 Jim Grimsley's Kirith Kirin
 Alexander Grin's Scarlet Sails

H
 Barbara Hambly's Dragonsbane
 Niel Hancock's Circle of Light, Wilderness of Four, and Windameir Circle series
 Victoria Hanley's Healer and Seer series
 M. John Harrison's Viriconium cycle
 Elizabeth Haydon's Symphony of Ages series
 Markus Heitz's The Dwarves
 Bernhard Hennen's Die Elfen series and Elfenritter trilogy
 Carolyn Hennesy's Pandora series
 Stuart Hill's "The Icemark Chronicles"
 Robin Hobb's Farseer, Liveship Traders and Tawny Man trilogies
 P. C. Hodgell's Jame of the Kencyrath series
 Wolfgang Hohlbein's Magic Moon series

I
 Ian Irvine's The Three Worlds Cycle series
 Ralf Isau's Neschan-Trilogie and Die Chroniken von Mirad

J
 Nabila Jamshed's Wish Upon A Time - The Legendary Scimitar
 Sylvia Janssen van Doorn's The Glister - The Summoned and the Outlaw
 N. K. Jemisin's The Inheritance trilogy (The Hundred Thousand Kingdoms, The Broken Kingdoms, and The Kingdom of Gods)
 Robert Jordan's The Wheel of Time series

K
 Guy Gavriel Kay's The Fionavar Tapestry trilogy
 Patricia Kennealy-Morrison's The Keltiad series
 Katharine Kerr's Deverry Cycle series
 Ulrich Kiesow's The Dark Eye novels
 Stephen King's The Dark Tower series
 Leena Krohn's Tainaron

L
 Mercedes Lackey's Valdemar series
 Mercedes Lackey's and James Mallory's Obsidian Trilogy
 Mercedes Lackey's and Andre Norton's The Halfblood Chronicles
 Derek Landy 's Skulduggery Pleasant
 Jay Lake's City Imperishable and Dark Town series
 Yulia Latynina's Empire of Veya series
 Stephen R. Lawhead's Song of Albion Trilogy
 Louise Lawrence's The Earth Witch
 Tanith Lee's Birthgrave series and The Winter Players
 Ursula K. Le Guin's Earthsea series; Annals of the Western Shore
 Fritz Leiber's Fafhrd and the Gray Mouser series
 C. S. Lewis's Chronicles of Narnia series
 Svyatoslav Loginov's Terrestrial Ways
 Sergei Lukyanenko's and Nick Perumov's Not the time for dragons

M
 Sarah J. Maas's Throne of Glass series, A Court of Thorns and Roses series
 R. A. MacAvoy's Tea with the Black Dragon
 George R. R. Martin's A Song of Ice and Fire series
 Svetlana Martynchik's Labyrinths of Echo series (under the pseudonym Max Frei)
 Aleksandr Mazin's Fargal, the World of Ashshur series and The Dragon of Kong series
 Anne McCaffrey's Dragonriders of Pern series
 Brian McClellan's Powder Mage series
 Dennis L. McKiernan's The Iron Tower trilogy and other Mithgar works
 Patricia A. McKillip's The Riddle-Master of Hed trilogy
 Robin McKinley's The Hero and the Crown
 China Miéville's Bas-Lag cycle
 Karen Miller's Godspeaker trilogy
 Hope Mirrlees's Lud-in-the-Mist
 L. E. Modesitt, Jr.'s The Saga of Recluce and Spellsong Cycle and The Imager Portfolio
 Elizabeth Moon's The Deed of Paksenarrion series
 Michael Moorcock's Elric of Melniboné series, Eternal Champion series

 William Morris' The Well at the World's End

N
 Vera Nazarian's Lords of Rainbow
 Stan Nicholls's Orcs: First Blood trilogy and Orcs: Bad Blood trilogy
 William Nicholson's Noble Warriors series
 Yuri Nikitin's The Three Kingdoms series
 Garth Nix's Old Kingdom Trilogy
 Andre Norton's Witch World series
 Naomi Novik's Uprooted

O
 Margaret Ogden's The Realm of the Elderlings series under the name Robin Hobb
 Nnedi Okorafor's Who Fears Death
 H. L. Oldie (Dmitry Gromov and Oleg Ladyzhensky)'s Fentezi series

P
 Christopher Paolini's Inheritance Cycle series
 Mervyn Peake's Gormenghast books
 Nick Perumov's Ring of Darkness, Hjorward chronicles, Keeper of the Swords series
 Meredith Ann Pierce's The Darkangel Trilogy
 Tamora Pierce's Tortall universe, Circle of Magic series
 Terry Pratchett's Discworld series
 Philip Pullman's His Dark Materials trilogy

R
 Melanie Rawn's Dragon Prince and Dragon Star trilogies and Exiles Trilogy
 L. James Rice's Sundering the Gods Saga
 Jennifer Roberson's Chronicles of the Cheysuli and The Sword-Dancer Saga
 Patrick Rothfuss's The Kingkiller Chronicle
 Vladislav Adolfovitch Rusanov's Hot Winds of North trilogy, Blades of Boundaries series and Dragons Slayer series
 Anthony Ryan's Raven's Shadow

S
 Fred Saberhagen's Earth End sequence
 Angie Sage's Septimus Heap
 R. A. Salvatore's Demon Wars series
 Brandon Sanderson's Mistborn series and The Stormlight Archive
 Andrzej Sapkowski's Witcher Saga
 Maria Semyonova's Wolfhound series
 Jeff Smith's Bone series
 Maria V. Snyder's Study Series and Glass Series
 Brynne Stephens' The Dream Palace
 Paul Stewart and Chris Ridell's The Edge Chronicles
 Jonathan Stroud's The Bartimaeus Trilogy
 Michael J. Sullivan's Riyria Revelations, Riyria Chronicles and The First Empire
 Rosemary Sutcliff's Celtic and Iron Age novels
 Tui T. Sutherland's Wings of Fire series
 Steph Swainston's The Year of Our War, Dangerous Offspring, and No Present Like Time
 Michael Swanwick's The Iron Dragon's Daughter, and the sequel The Dragons of Babel

T
 Judith Tarr
 Eldon Thompson's The Legend of Asahiel series
 J. R. R. Tolkien's The Hobbit, The Lord of the Rings, and other books set in Middle-earth
 Megan Whalen Turner's The Thief, The Queen of Attolia, The King of Attolia, A Conspiracy of Kings, Thick as Thieves and Return of the Thief
 S.I.U.'s Tower of God

V
 Jack Vance's Lyonesse Trilogy
 Jeff VanderMeer's Ambergris novels
 Vladimir Vasilyev's Shandalar

W
 David Weber's Oath of Swords/War God series
 Brent Weeks' Night Angel trilogy, and Lightbringer series
 Margaret Weis and Tracy Hickman's Dragonlance series
 Janny Wurts's Wars of Light and Shadow series
 Tad Williams's Memory, Sorrow, and Thorn trilogy and Shadowmarch series
 Gene Wolfe's The Wizard Knight series and The Book of the New Sun

Y
 Lee Yeongdo's Dragon Raja series and The Bird That Drinks Tears/The Bird That Drinks Blood
 Jane Yolen

Z
 Roger Zelazny's Amber series
 Paul Edwin Zimmer's Dark Border series: A Gathering of Heroes and Ingulf the Mad
 Alexander Zorich's The Ways of Starborned trilogy and The Vault of Equilibrium tetralogy

Other media
Avatar: The Last Airbender
The Last Airbender
The Legend of Korra
Game of Thrones
House of the Dragon
Conan the Barbarian
Conan the Destroyer
Red Sonja
The Barbarians
The Lord of the Rings (film series)
The Lord of the Rings: The Rings of Power

References

Fantasy genres
Lists of novels